Mochle  is a village in the administrative district of Gmina Sicienko, within Bydgoszcz County, Kuyavian-Pomeranian Voivodeship, in north-central Poland.

Prior to 1999, Mochle was within the Bydgoszcz Voivodeship.

The village has a population of 670.

References

Mochle